Adolf Černý (19 August 1864 in Hradec Králové – 27 December 1952 in Prague) was a Czech linguist, translator, poet and journalist, as well as professor of Slavic studies in Prague.

His principal research focus was on the Sorbian language. Černý also wrote poems under the pseudonym Jan Rokyta. The Jagiellonian University in Kraków awarded him an honorary doctorate in 1947.

Works
 Wobydlenje Łužiskich Serbow (1889)
 Lužické obrázky (1890)
 Svatba(kwas) u Lužickych Srbů (1893)
 Mythiske bytosće Łužiskich Serbow I. (1893)
 Různé (wšelakore) listy o Lužici (1894)
 Lilie z Tvých zahrad (1899)
 Stawizny basnistwa hornjołužiskich Serbow (1910)
 Lužice a Lužičtí Srbové (1912)
 Lužická otázka (prašenje) (1918)

References
 Radoslava Hnízdová, A Bibliographic Synopsis of Published Works, Prague, 1998.

External links

 

Slavists
1864 births
1952 deaths
Linguists from the Czech Republic
Czech poets
Czech male poets
People from Hradec Králové
Czech translators
Academic staff of Charles University